Saints Peter and Paul Catholic Church or Saints Peter and Paul Catholic Church Complex may refer to:
 Saints Peter and Paul Catholic Church Complex (Bow Valley, Nebraska), listed on the National Register of Historic Places in Cedar County, Nebraska
 Saints Peter and Paul Catholic Church Complex (Strasburg, North Dakota), listed on the National Register of Historic Places in Emmons County, North Dakota
 Saints Peter and Paul Catholic Church (Honolulu), a Roman Catholic church in Honolulu, Hawaii
 Saints Peter and Paul Catholic Church (Pocahontas, Iowa), listed on the National Register of Historic Places in Pocahontas County, Iowa
 Saints Peter and Paul Catholic Church (Sherrill, Iowa), the parish for Sherrill, Iowa
 Saints Peter and Paul Catholic Church (Solon, Iowa), listed on the National Register of Historic Places in Johnson County, Iowa
 Saints Peter and Paul Catholic Church (Sandusky, Ohio), a historic church building in Sandusky, Ohio
 Saints Peter and Paul Catholic Church (Decatur, Georgia), a Roman Catholic churches in the Archdiocese of Atlanta

See also
 St. Peter and St. Paul's Church (disambiguation)

Church, Catholic